The Cutting Room Floor 3 is the sixth mixtape by American hip hop producer and recording artist The Alchemist. It was released on December 25, 2013, through his own record label, ALC Records. It serves as the third instalment of The Cutting Room Floor mixtape series, following up the original 2003 mixtape and its 2008 sequel.

Track listing

Notes
 "Too Late" was originally released as a Bravehearts song titled "Never Too Late", which Nas' verse was initially featured on. This version appeared on the DJ Clue? mixtape Hev E. Components, Part 1 in 2001.
 "Jolly Ranchers" was originally released in April 2010, and later appeared as part of Raekwon's Cocainism, Vol. 2 mixtape under the title "Big Beat".
 "Perfectionist" was originally released in early 2011, with its music video releasing shortly after the release of the Maybach Music Group compilation Self Made, Vol. 1.
 "Mechanic" was originally released on the G-Unit mixtape Return of the Body Snatchers in 2008.
 "Doo Wop" was originally released on the Blu mixtape jesus in 2011, under the title "doowhop".
 "The Myth" was originally released on the Styles P mixtape The Diamond Life Project in 2012.

References

2013 albums
The Alchemist (musician) albums
Albums produced by the Alchemist (musician)